Nils Gunnar Ekman (born 18 June 1943) is a Swedish middle-distance runner. He reached semifinals of the 1500 m event at the 1972 Summer Olympics.

References

1943 births
Living people
Athletes (track and field) at the 1972 Summer Olympics
Swedish male middle-distance runners
Olympic athletes of Sweden
Place of birth missing (living people)